The 1962–63 Football League season was Birmingham City Football Club's 60th in the Football League and their 36th in the First Division. They finished in 20th position in the 22-team division, two points clear of the relegation places. They entered the 1962–63 FA Cup at the third round proper and lost in that round to Bury after a replay. They entered the League Cup at the second round and reached the final, in which they defeated local rivals Aston Villa 3–1 on aggregate score to win the first (and, until 2011, only) major trophy in their history.

Because of the severe winter weather – the so-called "Big Freeze of 1963" – Birmingham played no matches for ten weeks, between 22 December and 2 March. Their third-round FA Cup-tie was played in the first week of March, two months later than the usual date of the first weekend in January.

Twenty-three players made at least one appearance in nationally organised first-team competition, and there were eleven different goalscorers. Half back Terry Hennessey played in 52 of the 53 first-team matches over the season (forwards Ken Leek and Mike Hellawell missed only two), and Leek finished as leading goalscorer with 29 goals, of which 20 were scored in league competition.

Football League First Division

League table (part)

FA Cup

Because of the severe winter weather – the so-called "Big Freeze of 1963" – Birmingham played no matches for ten weeks, between 22 December and 2 March. Their opening third-round FA Cup-tie against Bury was postponed 14 times and abandoned once before finally being played two months after the originally scheduled date.

League Cup

The first leg of the final, against Birmingham's near neighbours Aston Villa, was played on 23 May at St Andrew's. Birmingham took the lead when Jimmy Harris fed Bertie Auld who crossed for Ken Leek's powerful shot, but Aston Villa equalised via Bobby Thomson. Seven minutes into the second half, the same combination of players made it 2–1, and after 66 minutes Jimmy Bloomfield "ended an excellent run by scoring from a narrow angle, earning even the applause of Villa players" to give Birmingham a 3–1 lead. The second leg, four days later at Villa Park, was goalless. Former England centre half Trevor Smith marked Thomson out of the game, Birmingham's defensive tactics included repeatedly kicking the ball out for throw-ins, and Aston Villa were unable to break their opponents down.

Appearances and goals

Players with name struck through and marked  left the club during the playing season.

See also
Birmingham City F.C. seasons

References
General
 
 
 Source for match dates and results: 
 Source for lineups, appearances, goalscorers and attendances: Matthews (2010), Complete Record, pp. 360–61.
 Source for kit: "Birmingham City". Historical Football Kits. Retrieved 22 May 2018.

Specific

Birmingham City F.C. seasons
Birmingham City